Erik Mikeš (born 5 June 1997) is a Slovak football forward who currently plays for Nové Mesto.

Club career

AS Trenčín
Mikeš made his professional Fortuna Liga debut for AS Trenčín against FC DAC 1904 Dunajská Streda on 13 August 2016.

References

External links
 AS Trenčín official club profile
 Fortuna Liga profile
 
 Eurofotbal profile
 Futbalnet profile

1997 births
Living people
Slovak footballers
Association football forwards
AS Trenčín players
Slovak Super Liga players
2. Liga (Slovakia) players